Gassam is a department or commune of Nayala Province in western Burkina Faso. Its capital is the town of Gassam. According to the 2019 census the department has a total population of 44,132.

Towns and villages
 Gassam	(6 176 inhabitants) (capital)
 Balanso	(493 inhabitants)
 Djimbara	(1 900 inhabitants)
 Dièrè	(2 342 inhabitants)
 Djin	(824 inhabitants)
 Goni	(830 inhabitants)
 Korombéré	(630 inhabitants)
 Kossé	(1 900 inhabitants)
 Koussiba	(341 inhabitants)
 Koussidian	(881 inhabitants)
 Laraba	(1 486 inhabitants)
 Larè	(1 086 inhabitants)
 Léry	(1 294 inhabitants)
 Lesséré	(933 inhabitants)
 Moara-Grand	(1 515 inhabitants)
 Moara-Petit	(693 inhabitants)
 Soni	(734 inhabitants)
 Soroni	(694 inhabitants)
 Soro	(1 537 inhabitants)
 Téri-Rimaïbé	(418 inhabitants)
 Téri-Samo	(342 inhabitants)
 Tissi	(1 528 inhabitants)
 Toubani	(651 inhabitants)
 Warou	(633 inhabitants)
 Zaba	(2 012 inhabitants)

References

Departments of Burkina Faso
Nayala Province